Two ships of the Japanese Navy have been named Kasumi:

 , an  launched in 1902 and broken up in 1920.
 , an  launched in 1937 and sunk in 1945.

Imperial Japanese Navy ship names
Japanese Navy ship names